Salomon Wininger (13 December 1877, Gura Humora, Bukovina – December 1968, in Ramat Gan, Israel) was an Austrian-Jewish biographer. He has been called one of the greatest Jewish biographers of all time.

Before World War I, Wininger lived in Chernivtsi and moved to Vienna during the war years, where he decided to write biographies of famous Jews. This idea was pushed in order to counter the self-hating mood of Jewish youth in the city, created under the influence of Otto Weininger's works.

After his return to Chernivtsi in 1921, Shlomo Wininger wrote about 13,000 biographies and published them in seven volumes between 1925 and 1936. He survived the time of World War II in Chernivtsi and emigrated in 1951 to Israel.

Works 
 Große Jüdische National-Biographie ("Lexicon of Jewish National Biographies"). Chernivtsi 1925–1936.
 Gura Humora: Geschichte einer Kleinstadt in der Südbukovina ("Gura Humora: History of a Small Town in South Bukovina").

References 
 Encyclopaedia Judaica. Vol. 16. Keter, Jerusalem 1971.
 Handbuch österreichischer Autorinnen und Autoren jüdischer Herkunft 18. bis 20. Jahrhundert. Vol. 3, S-Z. Ed.: Österreichische Nationalbibliothek Wien. K. G. Saur, München 2002, p. 1483.

External links
  

1877 births
1968 deaths
People from Gura Humorului
Bukovina Jews
Austrian male writers
Israeli people of Austrian-Jewish descent
Male biographers
20th-century biographers
Austrian biographers
Israeli biographers